A paper with delayed recognition (or a "sleeping beauty") is a publication that received very little attention (receiving few citations) shortly after publication, but later receives a dramatic increase in citations. For example, an 1884 article by Charles Sanders Peirce was rarely cited until about the year 2000, but has since garnered many citations.

The phenomenon has been studied in bibliometrics and scientometrics.

A 2015 study published in the Proceedings of the National Academy of Sciences concluded, after looking at over 22 million scientific papers of the prior 100 years, that "sleeping beauties are common", and seen even in the works of the most famous scientists. In particular, that a paper on an aspect of quantum mechanics that was published in 1935 by Albert Einstein, Boris Podolsky and Nathan Rosen, did not receive widespread attention until 1994. In the top 15 such papers in science, identified in the study, the delay for recognition was often 50 to 100 years.

Sleeping Beauties Studies 

Since van Raan's 2004 paper, the Sleeping Beauties metaphor developed into more focused research area with investigations and comparative analyses of Sleeping Beauties in specific areas. The paper highlighted (1) depth of sleep, (2) length of the sleep and (3) awake intensity. A 'Sleeping Beauty' paper, asleep for an extended duration is awakened by a 'Prince'. The depth of sleep may be deep (very long) or light.

In 2020, Moodley, Hernández Serrano, Dijck and Dumontier investigated the presence and features of sleeping beauties in case law from the Court of Justice of the European Union. Preliminary findings indicate that the B-coefficient could be a potential candidate for an additional measure of case relevance in the legal sphere.

A recent investigation of Sleeping Beauties in Innovation Studies  found only 8 Sleeping Beauties out of 52,373 relevant papers obtained via the Web of Science. This study found that "highly influential authors and self-awakening mechanisms were critical triggers for bringing SBs into scientific notoriety".

Sleeping Beauties are found to be rather rare in Psychology. A recent study by Yuh-Shan Ho and James Hartley found only three sleeping beauties in 303,255 relevant psychology papers.

Jian Du and Yishan Wu find that. Du and Wu suggest that Sleeping Beauties "may need one or more Princes  and even "retinues” to be
“awakened.”

Recent findings by van Raan and Winnink, indicate that technological innovations are reducing the length of sleep period, especially as associated with patenting activities. More so when waking is performed by a ‘technological prince'. A similar result was found in analyzing publications in medical research

References

Information science